The Malmö city bus network serves the city of Malmö and its surrounding area with 16 routes. City buses have operated in Malmö since 1927, supplementing and eventually supplanting the city's tram network. Buses continue to serve as the primary means of transport within the city, despite an expansion of intracity train services during the 2010s.

History

City buses in Malmö were originally operated by City of Malmö's Tramways (MSS), who acquired their first bus in 1927. With the closure of the last sections of tram network in the early 1970s, responsibility for and operation of city buses were moved to the municipal agency Malmö Lokaltrafik (ML). In 1993 the right-wing municipal government sold ML to Linjebuss, which was then contracted by Länstrafiken Malmöhus to operate city bus services.

When Skånetrafiken was formed from the traffic operators of Malmöhus and Kristianstad counties following their mergers into Skåne County, city buses in Malmö became part of Skånetrafiken, with the "ML Green" becoming the colour of city buses throughout Skåne.

Routes

Skånetrafiken also operate some specialised routes within Malmö. On days where Malmö FF are playing home games buses are operated as number 84 to Stadion from Klagshamn, Segevång, Riseberga, Nydala and Västra hamnen. A bus service within the Skåne University Hospital area in Malmö is also operated as number 99.

Malmöexpressen

Malmöexpressen (MEX, stylized as MalmöExpressen) is the name used by Skånetrafiken for bus rapid transit services within Malmö. Currently two lines, 5 and 8, are operated as Malmöexpressen, with another three (2, 4 and 10) planned to be converted to an MEX standard. Malmöexpressen is operated with gas-electric hybrid buses on Line 5 and fully electric buses on Line 8. 

Malmöexpressen Line 5 was the first BRT line to be introduced in Sweden when operations began in 2014. Line 5 was originally intended as a stop-gap measure, with the busways built enabling a construction of the future tramway being planned at the time. However, political issues resulted in these plans being shelved.

References

Transport in Malmö